Commedia dell'arte masks are one of the most integral aspects of each stock character. Each mask design is paired with a specific character based on its appearance and tradition. Masks were originally all made of leather, but now more commonly made of neoprene. The Commedia masks must show emotion and intelligence as they are covering the face which is the main place emotion can be seen on someone. Masks should be an extension of an actor and their costume, hair and accessories. A mask creates a completely different face for the person that is wearing it. Mask, in Commedia dell'arte speaks of the types of characters that each represents and includes all of the characters including the lovers. It is almost as speaking to the character rather than the masks, saying that they are a type that is unchanged.

Masks help with the performance and practice of Commedia because they help bring the characters to life. Commedia masks make a statement to the audience from the moment they are seen on stage. Masks tell the audience who the character is, their social class and type, what they will do or won't do, and what their attitudes are. A comic mask is a nobody and a somebody at the same time, the characters seem important even if they are a lowly servant. Characters who embody the upper class, usually the lovers or Innamorati and the lower class female servants do not wear physical headpieces, but their characters are still referred to as "masks." Commedia stock characters tend to introduce themselves as soon as they notice the audience and the mask helps them to do so. A comic mask is a nobody and somebody at the same time. A mask helps to create the beautiful, extravagant, repulsive and yet attractiveness of each character. Masks allow the actor to further explore the character. To the audience, the actor's physical movements and embodiment of the stock characters help to establish their character and the mask enhances it.  The mask and lazzo connected, without the lazzo a character in a mask is not making anything and is less entertaining. Masks and lazzo go hand in hand and you need one to have the other. Without one, the other is not as great and fantastic, or as funny, lazzi without masks is not as meaningful.

Every mask has to contain a combination of distinct characteristics to create their specific characters. The original Commedia dell'arte performers originated in the 1530s and 1540s, they wanted to be immediately recognized as the familiar characters that they portrayed as well as being exciting. The actors wanted to be easily recognized and remembered from one show to the next. Actors were playing the same character in every show, and these characters were people that everyone knows. The masks became each character, and without them the character could not be the same. The mask creates the personage of each character and makes them associated to their name and movements. It makes them an individual, yet one that the audience can easily identify. Many actors will look at the characters as being a mask, with it on they are that specific character, without it they are themselves or another character. Even lovers can wear a mask if they are using it to disguise themselves, yet they do not become another character in that instance. Commedia uses two different types of masks, that of the personage and identity of a character, a specific characters face. As well as the mask that is an object for lovers and other nonmasked characters to use as a disguise. Actors are directed more so by the mask than by the director, they use to the movements that are associated with that character and follow their characters type. An actor must surrender his entire body to the character not just change his face with the mask.

Mask types 

Each character has specific elements and a distinct appearance that makes them recognizable in performances across the world. A character's identification is often found through their mask and how it impacts their presence on stage. There are four or five classes that the masks can be grouped into: the old men such as Pantalone and Il Dottore; the young and adventurous man, Il Capitano; the servant sometimes named Zanni; and another old man though more crooked and crippled Pulcinella. The servant characters such as Zanni typically will have a long nose, sometimes with more curve for Pantalone, and the servants whose names that end in "ino" such as Truffaldino or Arlecchino are more often small and round. To follow traditional masks the servant characters such as Zanni should have big noses and smaller eyes, this creates a more animal look making them seem more primitive, as the servant is lower than the master. The zanni mask was one of the first and was a full mask, covering the full face and sometimes head, until the bottom of the mouth was removed. Capitano's mask has a strong brow, in a frown, wide eyes would only make his farrowed brow less prominent so the smaller eyes are better for him as well. Some characters also have hair, beards, eyebrows, or eyelashes. Brighella is one character mentioned to have a beard in some early mentions of masked characters. He is often known to have a mustache now that is swirled up to give him the mischievous feeling. Il Capitano is often described as having a long nose as well as Zanni, though typically larger. He also has a mustache sometimes that is a stiff and strong mustache under such a large nose, it almost looks like spikes poking out. Dottore also sometimes has hair, in the form of a small mustache, or eyebrows, and no upper lip. His mask covers the actors forehead and nose exposing their cheeks. Leaving the cheeks exposed so that the actor may use blush to create the look that he enjoys his spirits. Pantalone is known for his red and black costume but also his beard and easily recognizable mask.  His long pointed beard looks almost like an extension of his equally long nose, he sometimes also has a mustache and some bushy eyebrows to give him a very distinct look. Dottore and Pantalone though both old men, have very different looks.<ref>{{Cite book|title=Commedia delArte An Actors Handbook|last=Rudlin|first=John|publisher=Routledge|year=1994}}</ref>

Each mask has a very distinct look about it, some have large noses or foreheads, and others have bumps or are only a three quarter mask like Dottore. The distinct sections of the mask are the eyes, nose, forehead, upper lip and cheekbones,  these create the overall shape of each mask. Each of these features may be exaggerated, or maybe the mask does not have one of these quality. Dottore typically does not have cheekbones or an upper lip under his nose. One factor that is most dis-configured and proportioned is the nose. Someone making a mask has the freedom to show their talents and skills in these areas, the nose, cheekbones, brows, and lip, but they do need to follow the fundamentals of each character that they are creating so that they are still recognizable. One does not want to make il Dottore unrecognizable for who he is, or cause confusion between to characters because they are too similar. Much like the people you see on a daily bases, not all masks must be perfect, they can have bumps just like any person can. The characters have the same skin problems as teenagers and the elder we see daily.

 The unmasked 
Not all of the characters in Commedia dell'arte are masked, some are unmasked, and some wear  powdered faces instead of a mask. When actresses finally joined the men on stage they did not start wearing the masks, they wanted to show their faces as they were playing female lovers mostly. While men had been wearing masks and playing women before, now that women were playing the women, they did not want to hide their beautiful faces, even when they were a servant. This also meant that their counterparts, the male lovers, also stopped performing in masks. This led to more characters without masks, such as the "servetta (French, soubrette''),"  who was the female servant that was also unmasked such as Colombina. Though unmasked she would have heavy makeup around her eyes drawing the focus there. Pedrolino did not wear a mask, instead he had a floured face. He was the start of the white clowns we see today in circuses and in mime. These characters still maintain the classification as 'masked' because they still follow the character types, even without a mask they are still a type.  Both lovers tend to wear heavy makeup that almost forms its own mask containing beauty marks and heavy mascara.

Mask construction 
In making a mask there are a few different ways to do this, leather is the traditional material used but there is also paper mache and plaster casts. Leather is the most used material for making masks as it is the easiest to shape without hurting the face. Leather is also close to the skin and creates a light, easy to wear mask that holds shape and life on stage. The process of working with leather to build Commedia Masks is relatively extensive. To begin, leather is first soaked for a 48 hours minimum. The leather is then draped over a base molded to the shape of a face. Once it is placed the leather is stretched by the artist's hands or a smooth wooden tool. The shaping is repeated continuously and the artist continues pushing it into the crevices formed by the mold. After the artist has manipulated the leather to its desired shape it is then dried. Drying the mask can be achieved in two ways: with a heat source (even a hairdryer in the modern day) or for an extensive air-drying period. Once the leather is completely dry the artist then applies a hardening agent.

References

Commedia dell'arte
Masks in theatre
Masks in Europe